HMS Seagull (or Sea Gull) was the name vessel for the Seagull class of brig-sloops of the Royal Navy. She was launched on 1 July 1805 and saw active service under the British flag in Danish waters until 19 June 1808 when Dano-Norwegian forces sank her. The Danes raised her and refitted her for service in the Dano-Norwegian Navy, which she served until the end of the English Wars in 1814. She then was transferred to the Norwegians. She was finally decommissioned in 1817.

British service (1805–1808)
Seagull was commissioned under Commander Robert Cathcart in August 1805.

O 10 April 1806 she sent a Prussian galiot into the Downs.
She was active in 1807 in the North Sea and the Downs and received prize money for the following captures, either alone or in company with other British vessels.
 Venus (8 July); This was the Venus, of Pappenburg, which had been sailing from Christiana to France; 
 Resolution (27 August);
 Aurora (27 August);
 Gabriel (27 August);
 Karen and Amalia (27 August);
 Emanuel (28 August);
 Dolphin (28 August);
 Haabet Ankes (28 August); and
 Fly (31 October).
In addition, she recaptured two ships:
 Jane (24 February); and 
 the transport brig Elizabeth (15 November).

Three privateers had captured Elizabeth, Edwards, master, on 15 October. as Dove was coming from Copenhagen. Seagull brought her into Dover.

Lastly, Seagulls boats retrieved Dove, which they found drifting and derelict on 29 August 1807 off the coast of France. Dove, of Weymouth, had a cargo of stone. Seagull brought her into the Downs.

Capture

On 19 June 1808, off the Naze of Norway in the vicinity of the port of Kristiansand, Seagull chased the Dano-Norwegian brig Lougen, which was armed with 18 short 18-pounder guns and two long 6-pounder guns. Lougen, under the command of 1st Lieutenant Peter Frederik Wulff (1774-1842), tried to maintain some distance between herself and Seagull to take advantage of the longer range of Lougens 18-pounder guns relative to the range of Seagulls 24-pounder carronades.

The chase brought both vessels close in shore where the breeze was lessening to a near calm. Seagull tried to get between Lougen and the shore to prevent the Dane from reaching Kristiansand.

Unfortunately for Seagull, about 20 minutes into the engagement six Danish gunboats arrived from behind some rocks and in two divisions of three each took up positions on Seagulls quarter, where they fired on her with their 24-pounder guns while Lougen fired on her larboard bow. Within half an hour the Danish fire had badly damaged Seagulls rigging and dismounted five of her guns. Eventually Cathcart, who was himself severely wounded, struck, having lost eight men killed and 20 wounded. Vice-Admiral Thomas Wells, on reading the battle report, expressed his strong opinion that such gallantry should be made public. Lougen had only one man killed and a dozen men slightly wounded.

The Danes held Cathcart as a prisoner of war until October 1808. In November he, his officers and crew were tried aboard  for the loss of their ship. The court honourably acquitted them all and the senior officer of the  board returned Cathcart's sword to him. Cathcart received promotion to post-captain and his first lieutenant, Villiers Francis Hatton, received promotion to commander. Cathcart's promotion was backdated to the date of the action.

Shortly after the action the Danes promoted Wulff to lieutenant-commander and he was elevated to knight of Danneborg.

Danish service (1808–1814)

The Danes removed the crew of the Seagull, including the dead and wounded, and sent damage control parties aboard. However, Seagull had more than five feet of water in her hull and sank suddenly, drowning several Danes. Lieutenant Wigelsen, second in command of Lougen, took command of the prize and recorded in his personal diary:

Still, Seagull had sunk in the relatively shallow waters of Fosseholmen Bay some five miles south-west of Kristiansand, with her port bulwark remaining above the water. The Danes were able later to raise and refit her for service with the Dano-Norwegian Navy. She was commissioned under 1st. Lieutenant O. Kr. Budde.

On 25 November 1808, this ship, now known simply in Danish records as The Seagull, successfully fought and captured a Swedish gunboat, Gripen. The Seagull was operating out of Kristiansand, and the capture was effected off Skagen. Gripen was armed with nine guns (four 3-pounders, four 12-pounders, and a 36-pounder howitzer), and had a crew of 40 men under the command of Lieutenant Molbergs Besaling.

In all, four Danish brigs and several gunboats attacked Tribune before retiring back to Mandahl. Tribune suffered nine men and boys killed, and 15 seamen and marines wounded.

In the aftermath of the Battle of Lyngør, a British reconnaissance by the cutter  of Danish warships in the area reported the presence of The Seagull, of 16 guns and 100 men, lying at Christiansand - but concluded that the Danes could effect nothing of importance that summer (of 1812).

By 1813 The Seagull was under the command of Kapteinløitnant C. Lütken. In late December Seagull, Lolland, and Samsøe sailed to Frederickshavn, Jutland to escort a convoy of vessels carrying much-needed grain to Norway. They succeeded in their mission, although they lost one of the grain ships to a Swedish privateer.

Norwegian service (1814–1817)
At the end of the Anglo-Danish wars, Norway separated from Denmark. The Seagull, which was based in Kristiansand, became part of the Royal Norwegian Navy. She was decommissioned in 1817.

Notes

Citations

References
 
 
 
 

 

Brigs of the Royal Navy
1805 ships
Captured ships
Brigs of the Royal Dano-Norwegian Navy
Ships of the Royal Norwegian Navy
1814 in Norway
Ships built in Kent